The Lagos State Ministry of Housing is the state government ministry, charged with the responsibility to plan, devise and implement the state policies on Housing.

The  Lagos state current commissioner of housing,Hon.Moruf Akinderu-Fatai has made it known to the general public and people of Lagos state about the  intention of the Lagos state government to ease home ownership for its people.

The Bayview Estate, a 100-unit housing project in Ikate-Elegushi, Lekki, was opened by Lagos State Governor Babajide Sanwo-Olu.

Vision
To establish a sustainable housing delivery system that will ensure easy access to home ownership and rental schemes by the Nigerian populace in an environment where basic physical and social amenities are available.

Mission
To facilitate the provision of adequate and affordable housing for all Nigerians, in both the urban and rural areas, in secure, healthy and decent environment.

Departments
Architectural Services.
Building & Quantity Surveying.
Engineering Services.
Lands & Housing.
Urban & Regional Development.
Finance & Accounts.
Human Resources Management.
Planning, Research & Statistics.

Units
Federal Housing Authority (FHA).
Federal Mortgage Bank of Nigeria (FMBN).
Millennium Development Goals (MDG).
Public Private Partnership.
Procurement.
Servicom.
Internal Audit.

See also
Lagos State Ministry of Health
Lagos State Executive Council
Lagos state Ministry of Education

References

Government ministries of Lagos State
Housing in Lagos State
Public housing in Lagos
Lagos